(KOF '96) is a fighting game released by SNK for the Neo Geo arcade and home consoles in 1996. It is the third game in The King of Fighters series, following The King of Fighters '95. Like its predecessor, the game was ported to the Neo-Geo CD, as well as the PlayStation and Sega Saturn. Unlike the previous game, the PlayStation and Saturn versions were released only in Japan, with a language setting allowing the player to set the game to English. It is also part of the compilation The King of Fighters Collection: The Orochi Saga for the PlayStation 2, PlayStation Portable and Wii. It was also released on the Wii Virtual Console in Japan on February 15, 2011, in North America on July 12, 2012 and in the PAL region on November 22, 2012.

The game made a few changes to gameplay such as new techniques, various changes of some teams, with a few of them introducing new characters. The plot follows a new King of Fighters tournament created by Chizuru Kagura, the heir of Yata Clan who wants to find and recruit Kyo Kusanagi, who defeated the previous host, Rugal Bernstein, to ask him and his bitter rival, Iori Yagami, to help her in the sealing of the Orochi demon. The new boss is one of the servants from Orochi, Goenitz, who appears after Chizuru is defeated.

SNK members had various troubles with the development of the game as they were dragged on right up to the time of its scheduled release. This happened since developers had difficulties with making the sprites and special moves of new characters from the game. The game has had mixed reviews from several video games publications. While some reviewers have praised the graphical improvements and the addition of new characters, some have commented it was unbalanced in comparison to its prequels.

Gameplay

KOF '96 makes significant changes to the gameplay of previous KOF games by introducing new techniques. The Dodge technique from the previous two games has been replaced with an "emergency evasion" or "attack deflector" technique, which allows the player's character to roll away or towards the opponent. In the latter case, the player has the opportunity to end up at the other side of their opponent. The player can also determine the height of their jumps and perform small or high jumps. Additionally, the graphics for all the character sprites have been redrawn and the commands for certain Special and Super moves have been changed from previous games. Super Special Moves can still be performed when the Power Gauge is filled up or when the player's life gauge is flashing red, but in addition to this, the player can also perform a more powerful version of their regular Super move if both conditions are met (i.e., the player has low energy and their power gauge has reached Maximum level). One other change to the gameplay system is that the player can now run instead of hopping forward in order to approach the opponent faster.

Plot
A new King of Fighters tournament is announced, though the letters of invitation sent out to the fighters are no longer sent by Rugal Bernstein. There are many changes in the tournament's approach. Since the previous year, the tournament's fame has grown immensely, turning it into a major international event. Huge corporations transform the King of Fighters tournament into something widely televised, commercialized, and celebrated, drawing in many crowds from around the world. The tournament is now held by Chizuru Kagura, a descendant of the ancient Yata Clan responsible for sealing the snake demon Orochi along with the Kusanagi and Yasanaki clans (the clans from Kyo Kusanagi and Iori Yagami, respectively). Chizuru uses the tournament in hopes of finding and recruiting Kyo and Iori in order to stop the upcoming Orochi threat, but Kyo and Iori aren't willing to work together on friendly terms.

Characters

The character roster underwent major changes since the previous game. The Rival Team was disbanded, with only Iori Yagami returning, while Heidern and Takuma Sakazaki retired from the tournament. Takumas spot in the Art of Fighting Team is taken by his daughter Yuri Sakazaki, formerly with the Women Fighters Team. New characters include Kasumi Todoh from Art of Fighting 3, who takes Yuris place in the Women Fighters Team; Leona, who joins the Ikari Team in place of her mentor and adoptive father, Heidern; Mature and Vice, two of Rugal's assistants who join Iori Yagami as members of the new Yagami Team; and the Boss Team, composed of Geese Howard, Wolfgang Krauser, and Mr. Big, all villains from the Fatal Fury and Art of Fighting series. The new boss character is Goenitz, a servant from Orochi who wants to stop Chizuru's plans of sealing his master.

Japan Team (Hero Team)
Kyo Kusanagi
Benimaru Nikaido
Goro Daimon

Fatal Fury Team
Terry Bogard
Andy Bogard
Joe Higashi

Art of Fighting Team
Ryo Sakazaki
Robert Garcia
Yuri Sakazaki

Ikari Warriors Team
Leona Heidern (New Character)
Ralf Jones
Clark Still

Psycho Soldier Team
Athena Asamiya
Sie Kensou
Chin Gentsai

Korea Team
Kim Kaphwan
Chang Koehan
Choi Bounge

Women Fighters Team
Kasumi Todoh (New Character)
Mai Shiranui
King

Yagami Team (Rivals Team)
 Iori Yagami
 Mature (New Character)
 Vice (New Character)

Boss Team
 Geese Howard (New Character)
 Wolfgang Krauser (New Character)
 Mr. Big (New Character)

Mid-Boss
Chizuru Kagura (New Character)

Main Boss
Goenitz (New Character)

Development and release
The development period for KOF '96 dragged on right up to the time of its scheduled release. At the location test for the title, Mature and Vice were still not included in the game, since the staff did not have enough time to completely design them. The King of Fighters '96 is the second game to break the technical limits of the Neo Geo platform by using a memory footprint of 362 mega bits (which is roughly 46 mega bytes). The proposed theoretical limit of game sizes prior to this was 330 mega bits. Real Bout Fatal Fury, which released in 1995, was the first game to break the 330 mega bit barrier.

Kasumi Todoh was added to the cast since the coinciding release of Art of Fighting 3 had increased the character's profile. Geese Howard from Fatal Fury was first meant to appear in KOF '95, but developers abandoned this idea. When KOF '96 began development, the staff decided to make Geese become a playable character. The Boss Team in which he starred along with Mr. Big and Wolfgang Krauser received "special treatment", such as music for each individual member (in comparison to other teams, who only had one). Due to memory restrictions, some of the special moves that were designed for Geese had to be left out of the game. The sub-boss character, Chizuru Kagura, was the hardest one to create. Her pixelated image was completed in a month, and the designer in charge of her often worked until six in the morning. The game also meant to introduce Whip into the Ikari Team. However, due to Leona's introduction in the same team, the developers waited until The King of Fighters '99 to add her to the cast.

The original KOF '96 was released for Japanese arcades on July 30, 1996. Neo Geo and Neo Geo CD versions were released on September 27, 1996 and October 25, 1996, respectively. The Sega Saturn port was released on December 31, 1996 and the PlayStation port on July 4, 1997. Unlike the previous game, the PlayStation and Saturn versions were released only in Japan, with a language setting allowing the player to set the game to English. The Saturn version optionally uses a 1MB RAM cartridge to run additional animations which would not fit in the Saturn's internal RAM. A Saturn Best Collection version of the port was released on October 1, 1998. The PlayStation version was a best seller and was rereleased in the PlayStation the Best series in Japan. It was also included in The King of Fighters Collection: The Orochi Saga in 2008 for the PlayStation 2, PlayStation Portable and Wii.

Like the previous game, a Game Boy game based on The King of Fighters '96 was released by Takara in Japan titled Nettō The King of Fighters '96 on August 8, 1997, and was released in Europe titled The King of Fighters: Heat of Battle in 1998. This version only includes 17 of the 29 characters in the original version. The Game Boy game features a secret code called "Carnage" mode, which allows the player's (including CPU) Power Gauge to be filled automatically without charging. This feature also enables the player to use powerful versions of their Super Special Moves and normal versions of Super Special Moves without having the player's health at a low rate. Characters exclusive to the Game Boy version includes Orochi Iori and Orochi Leona from The King of Fighters '97, a stronger version of Chizuru Kagura, the final boss of the game, Goenitz, and Mr. Karate (Takuma's persona in the original Art of Fighting).

An extensive database for the game, titled The King of Fighters '96 Neo Geo Collection, was released on February 14, 1997 to promote the year's title. It was available only for the Neo-Geo CD. The database includes the game's intro, an interactive reenactment of the game's backstory, character profiles spoken by their voice actors, outtakes, an exclusive gallery section from the creators, a complete command list and a sound selection. A similar version of this game, The King of Fighters '96 Perfect File, was also released for Windows and Macintosh computers. This version was released on June 18, 1997 and includes most of the features found in its predecessor.

Reception and legacy

In Japan, Game Machine listed The King of Fighters '96 on their September 1, 1996 issue as being the most-successful arcade game of the month. According to Famitsu, the AES version sold over 33,323 copies in its first week on the market.

The game received praise and criticism from video game publications, which commented on its new additions. The four reviewers of Electronic Gaming Monthly gave the Neo Geo AES version a 7.5 out of 10, citing the huge roster of fighters and retention of the series' strong playability. However, Dan Hsu and Sushi-X both criticized it for failing to improve graphically over the previous installment and thereby keep up with contemporary 2D fighting series such as Street Fighter. 1UP.com noted the game to be unbalanced in comparison to its prequel such as noting the projectile attacks needed to be improved. However, they liked the additions of Vice and Mature and more character interaction such as the special introductions between related characters, custom endings and custom winposes. Chris Wigham from consoleob.com also found issues with projectile moves, as the fights were closer. However, he noted the graphics to have gone through a big improvement in comparison to KOF '95. Zentendo.com writer Chuck Allen praised the improvements of music and voice acting such as the announcer's voice which is "audible and understandable". He also praised the addition of new characters to the cast as well as the boss Goenitz, who is easier to defeat than Rugal Berstein from KOF '95. In a review from the compilation The King of Fighters Collection: The Orochi Saga, George Damidas from entdepot.com commented that KOF '96 should be the first game as he praised the graphical improvements and the new characters appearing in the series.

Electronic Gaming Monthly editors named The King of Fighters '96 their Neo Geo Game of the Year, calling it "an excellent packaged deal for any fan of 2-D sprite-based fighting games."

The rerelease port obtained a good review by Nintendo Life based on the improvements SNK added to the title, such as balancing the gameplay, movements of characters but criticized the audio.

GameSpot noted the game helped start "a modest resurgence in the sales of AES consoles and cartridges." During its release week, the Sega Saturn port of the game sold 109,752 copies in Japan. As of 2004, the sales went to 155,116.

The game received a sequel titled The King of Fighters '97 a year following its release. Ryo Takamisaki also wrote The King of Fighters G, a manga that retells the events of the game following Athena Asamiya.

Notes

References

External links 
 
 The King of Fighters '96 at GameFAQs
 The King of Fighters '96 at Giant Bomb
 The King of Fighters '96 at Killer List of Videogames
 The King of Fighters '96 at MobyGames

1996 video games
2D fighting games
ACA Neo Geo games
Aicom games
Arcade video games
D4 Enterprise games
Fighting games
Game Boy games
Multiplayer and single-player video games
Neo Geo games
Neo Geo CD games
Nintendo Switch games
PlayStation (console) games
PlayStation 4 games
PlayStation Network games
Sega Saturn games
SNK games
SNK Playmore games
Takara video games
The King of Fighters games
Video games scored by Masahiko Hataya
Video games set in Japan
Video games set in the United States
Video games set in South Korea
Virtual Console games
Video games developed in Japan
Xbox One games
Hamster Corporation games